Razack is a given name. Notable people with the name include:

Abdool Razack Mohamed Kt, MP (1906–1978), Indian born former key Mauritian Minister in the pre and post-independence cabinet of Mauritius
Abdou Razack Traoré (born 1988), Ivorian-born Burkinabe footballer
Abraham Razack, SBS, JP (born 1945), the member of the Legislative Council of Hong Kong (LegCo)
K. M. Abdul Razack, Indian politician and former Member of the Legislative Assembly of Tamil Nadu
Sherene Razack, a Canadian postcolonial, anti-racist feminist scholar and activist of Indian descent

See also
Fatel Razack, the first ship to bring indentured labourers from India to Trinidad